Amy Duncan is a Scottish singer-songwriter and multi-instrumentalist. She has recorded seven albums: Pilgrimage (2006), Story of a Girl (2007), Potential-Space (2010), Cycles of Life (2013) Undercurrents (2016), Antidote (2017) and The Hidden World (2020) which was released under her own label, Filly Records.

Musical career 

Duncan is a classically trained double bass player, studying at both the RNCM in Manchester and the RSAMD in Glasgow. After completing her studies, Duncan played double bass in experimental band Swelling Meg, who achieved a following in Edinburgh and Glasgow's underground music scene but disbanded in 2000.

Becoming a mother in 2000 saw Duncan channel her new perspective on life into song writing. Her debut album, 'Pilgrimage', was released in 2006 on US record label Plain Recordings, who discovered Duncan's music via social networking site Myspace.
Between 2007 and 2010, Amy independently released a further two albums: Story of a Girl (2007) and Potential-Space (2010). Her track 'My Dad' from the album 'Story of A Girl' was one of the winners of Burnsong 2007.

Linn records 

In December 2012, Linn Records announced that they had signed Duncan. managing director of Linn Products Ltd, Gilad Tiefenbrun, said of the signing:

"We're excited to have Amy Duncan on Linn Records because she is everything we look for in new talent: original songwriting and heart-felt, pitch-perfect delivery combined in a powerful, musical experience."

Duncan stated:"Up until now my music has been entirely self-produced, and although I have loved that process there has always been a frustration that it doesn't sound as clear and as alive as it could. It feels very right to now be releasing the album with Linn Records, whose ethos of high quality sound is very close to my own heart and I'm very excited indeed that people will be able to listen to the recording in studio master quality."

Cycles of Life 

Cycles of Life (2013), Duncan's fourth album, was released on 15 April 2013. This album was produced by Calum Malcolm with funding from Creative Scotland.

Her first single from the album, 'Navigating', was released in February 2013.

Discography

Albums 

 Pilgrimage (2006)
 Story of a Girl (2007)
 Potential-Space (2010)
 Cycles of Life (2013)
 Undercurrents (2016)
 Antidote (2017)
 The Hidden World (2020)

Singles 

 Navigating (2013)

References 

Scottish singer-songwriters
Alumni of the Royal Conservatoire of Scotland
Alumni of the Royal Northern College of Music
Year of birth missing (living people)
Place of birth missing (living people)
Living people